Meretrix lyrata, the lyrate Asiatic hard clam, also known simply as the hard clam, is an edible saltwater clam, a marine bivalve mollusc in the family Veneridae, the Venus clams.

This species occurs along the coasts of Vietnam, Taiwan, the Philippines, Sarawak (Malaysian Borneo) and South China.

<div align=center>
Right and left valve of the same specimen:

</div align=center>

Culinary use
In Vietnam, these hard clams are eaten boiled, steamed or roasted. They are an important export in the eastern and southern parts of Vietnam.

References

 Reid, Shannon (2003).  OBIS Indo-Pacific Molluscan Database, Academy of Natural Sciences.
 
 

Veneridae
Bivalves described in 1851